The Northwest Junior Hockey League is a defunct Junior "B" ice hockey league in Manitoba, Canada, sanctioned by Hockey Canada. The league's only provincial rival, the Manitoba Junior B Hockey League, still exists as the Keystone Junior Hockey League.

In the 13-season history of the league NJHL teams would go on to win the Baldy Northcott Trophy three times: Norway House North Stars (2001, 2004) and NCN Flames (2002).

Teams

Champions

External links
Cross Lake Islanders
NCN Flames
Norway House North Stars
OCN Storm

Defunct ice hockey leagues in Manitoba
Hockey Manitoba